The Chongming line is a rapid transit line on the Shanghai Metro that is part of the 2018–2023 Shanghai Metro plan. The Chongming line was previously treated as the last phase of Line 9, and was Line 19 until 2016, when it was renamed the Chongming line.

The phase I construction is expected to be opened at the end of 2025.

History

Planned stations
Station names according to an April 2019 planning document.

References

Shanghai Metro lines
Proposed buildings and structures in Shanghai
Shang